Cape Hawke is a coastal headland in Australia on the New South Wales coast, just south of Forster/Tuncurry and within the Booti Booti National Park.

The cape was named by Captain Cook when he passed it on his Endeavour voyage on 12 May 1770, honoring Edward Hawke who was First Lord of the Admiralty.

References 

Cape Hawke page at Geoscience Australia

https://monumentaustralia.org.au/themes/landscape/discovery/display/21219-captain-james-cook

Hawke
Mid-Coast Council